Hilary Rose is an Irish actress and writer. She is best known for her portrayal of Mairéad MacSweeney in The Young Offenders franchise, including the 2016 feature film and its subsequent television series, which commenced in 2018.

Early life

Career
Her first credit was in the short film The Kings of Cork City in 2005. The majority of Rose's earlier credits include minor roles in Fair City (2007), Apollo Music Club (2008), Zonad (2009), The Tudors (2010), Galactik Football (2010), Republic of Telly (2011), The Fear (2012), Vikings (2013), Beat Girl (2013), The Centre (2014) and Sacrifice (2016).

In 2016, Rose was cast in the role of Máiréad MacSweeney in the 2016 feature film The Young Offenders, developed by her husband Peter Foott. The film was a success, it had the biggest opening weekend at the Irish box office of any Irish film in 2016. As a result of her critically acclaimed performance in the film, Rose was nominated for "Best Actress in a Supporting Role" at the 2017 Irish Film and Television Awards, in which she lost out to Charleigh Bailey.

The Young Offenders led to a television series, which commenced in 2018 on BBC Three and RTÉ2,. which was aired between February and March 2018. The success of the first led to a second being commissioned, broadcast in November 2019.

Personal life
Rose is married to award-winning director Peter Foott. They have collaborated in The Young Offenders franchise.

Filmography

Awards and nominations
Hilary Rose won Comedian of the Year at the Stellar Magazine Shine Awards 2014.

References

External links

Hilary Rose website

Living people
People from Galway (city)
21st-century Irish actresses
Irish film actresses
Irish television actresses
Year of birth missing (living people)